Eggshells is a 1969 American independent experimental film directed by Tobe Hooper in his directorial debut. Hooper, who co-wrote the film with Kim Henkel, also served as one of the film's producers. The film centers on a commune of young hippies, who slowly become aware of an otherworldly presence that resides in the basement.

Plot

A group of young hippies, having recently moved into an old house in the woods, slowly become aware of an otherworldly presence residing in the basement of the house.

Cast
 Mahlon Foreman as Mahlon
 Ron Barnhart as Ron
 Amy Lester as Amy
 Kim Henkel as Toes
 Pamela Craig as Pam
 Jim Schulman as Jim
 Allen Danziger as Allen

Reception

In 2017, Zane Gordon-Bouzard of Birth.Movies.Death stated that the film "lay[s] out its rambling vision of hippie life in Austin, Texas in a series of acid-splashed reveries". Gordon-Bouzard also noted that the film displayed many of the themes and motifs that would become a staple in director Hooper's later films. Louis Black from The Austin Chronicle gave the film a positive review, stating that the film very much emulated the works of Jean-Luc Godard. Black also praised the film for its capturing of 1960s Austin attitudes and lifestyles, as well as the psychedelic visuals and Hooper's direction.

See also
 List of American films of 1969

Citations

Sources

Books

Websites

Further reading

External links
 
 
 

1960s avant-garde and experimental films
1969 films
1969 directorial debut films
1969 independent films
American avant-garde and experimental films
American independent films
Films directed by Tobe Hooper
Films with screenplays by Kim Henkel
Films shot in Austin, Texas
Hippie films
Psychedelic films
1960s English-language films
1960s American films